Oxford Business Park was acquired by Brookfield in 2021 and has been renamed to ARC Oxford in September 2022.

The 88-acre (360,000 m2) campus sits in ARC’s (Advanced Research Clusters) network of science and innovation campuses, including ARC Uxbridge, ARC West London and Harwell Science and Innovation Campus.

The campus sits within Oxford Ring Road and is 2.3 miles from Oxford City Centre and the train station, one hour by train to Paddington and 50 minutes in the car to London Heathrow

There are 37 businesses, and science companies at ARC Oxford including

Oxford Biodynamics

Ivy Farm

Oxbotica

Perspectum

The campus also offers co-working facilities and a coffee and lunch shop.

History 
In 1912, William Morris bought the former Oxford Military College and moved his car company into the site. Morris pioneered mass production in the UK by building what became affectionately known as “the old tin shed.” The factory produced cars such as the Morris Oxford, the MG Midget and the legendary Mini.

Morris, who became Viscount Nuffield in 1938, was a noted philanthropist. He founded Nuffield College and the Nuffield Foundation. In response to the polio epidemic he retooled part of the factory to make Iron Lungs for any hospital that requested one.

References

External links 
ARC Oxford website
Oxford City Council website

Buildings and structures in Oxford
Business parks of England
Economy of Oxford